Suffolk Artillery Volunteers may refer to:
 1st Suffolk Artillery Volunteer Corps
 1st (Lowestoft) Suffolk Artillery Volunteer Corps
 2nd (Walton) Suffolk Artillery Volunteer Corps
 3rd (Aldeburgh) Suffolk Artillery Volunteer Corps
 4th (Beccles) Suffolk Artillery Volunteer Corps
 1st Suffolk and Harwich Volunteer Artillery
 1st Suffolk and Harwich Royal Garrison Artillery (Volunteers)

See also
 Suffolk Artillery Militia

Military units and formations disambiguation pages